Yeh Kahan Aa Gaye Hum is an Indian Hindi language supernatural musical-drama television show that aired from 26 October 2015 to 24 August 2016 Monday to Friday at 9:30pm (IST) on &TV. The show is produced by Ekta Kapoor of Balaji Telefilms and starred Karan Kundra and Saanvi Talwar as the protagonists.

Cast

Main

 Karan Kundra as Rahul Sabharwal, Manvi's husband
 Saanvi Talwar as Manvi Rahul Sabharwal (née Chatterjee), Rahul's wife

Recurring
 Naveen Saini as Raj Sabharwal, & rahul' s father
 Papiya Sengupta as Sonali Raj Sabharwal, Raj's 2nd wife, Shaleen & Rahul's step mother 
 Ashish Mehrotra as Shaleen Sabharwal 
 Tanu Khan as Nisha Shaleen Sabharwal, Shaleen's wife
 Usha Rana as Mrs. Sabharwal (Dadi), Raj's mother, Shaleen & Rahul's grandmother
 Miraj Joshi as Nikhil Sabharwal
 Kali Prasad Mukherjee as Upamanyu Chatterjee, Manvi's father
 Deepali Kamath as Shilpa Upamanyu Chatterjee, Manvi's mother
 Aly Goni as Kabir Raichand (Agni) 
 Giriraj Kabra as Harsh Chatterjee
 Arun Singh Rana as Sujoy
 Mansi Sharma as Yamini
 Avdeep Sidhu as Yugant
 Shireen Mirza as Dr. Shireen
 Charu Mehra as Avanti Talwar
 Paridhi Sharma as Ambika
 Anjali Ujwane as Anamika Raichand, Kabir's aunt
 Priya Shinde as Malvika (Spirit)
 Phalguni Sharma as cameo
 Mahima Makwana as cameo
 Khushboo Shroff as Twinkle
 Kajal Pisal as Kamya

References

Balaji Telefilms television series
Hindi-language television shows
2015 Indian television series debuts
2016 Indian television series endings
&TV original programming
Television shows set in Mumbai